The 2003 Synsam Swedish Open was a men's tennis tournament played on outdoor clay courts in Båstad, Sweden and was part of the International Series of the 2003 ATP Tour. It was the 56th edition of the tournament and ran from 7 July until 13 July 2003. Fifth-seeded Mariano Zabaleta won the singles title.

Finals

Singles

 Mariano Zabaleta defeated  Nicolás Lapentti 6–3, 6–4
 It was Zabaleta's only title of the year and the 2nd of his career.

Doubles

 Simon Aspelin /  Massimo Bertolini defeated  Lucas Arnold /  Mariano Hood 6–7(3–7), 6–0, 6–4
 It was Aspelin's 2nd title of the year and the 3rd of his career. It was Bertolini's only title of the year and the 2nd of his career.

External links
 Official website
 ATP tournament profile

Synsam Swedish Open
Swedish Open
Swedish Open
July 2003 sports events in Europe
Swed